The first Dibbs ministry was the 21st ministry of the Colony of New South Wales, and was the first of three occasions of being led by the Premier, George Dibbs. Dibbs was elected to the New South Wales Legislative Assembly in 1874.

The title of Premier was widely used to refer to the Leader of Government, but was not a formal position in the government until 1920. Instead the Premier was appointed to another portfolio, usually Colonial Secretary, but on this occasion Dibbs kept the portfolio of Colonial Treasurer he had held in the Stuart ministry.

There was no party system in New South Wales politics until 1887. Under the constitution, ministers in the Legislative Assembly were required to resign to recontest their seats in a by-election when appointed. Such ministerial by-elections were usually uncontested and on this occasion most of the ministers had been appointed prior to the election in October 1885. The two new ministers, Thomas Slattery (Boorowa) and William Lyne (The Hume), were re-elected unopposed.

This ministry covers the period from 7 October 1885 until 21 December 1885. Dibbs took over as Premier following the October 1885 resignation of Sir Alexander Stuart due to ill-health. At the subsequent election Dibbs' government polled badly and despite attempting to govern; less than three months later when it became clear that there would be a budget deficit of over £1m. Dibbs was succeeded by Sir John Robertson.

Composition of ministry

Ministers are members of the Legislative Assembly unless otherwise noted.

See also

References

 

New South Wales ministries
1885 establishments in Australia
1885 disestablishments in Australia